Trey Landers (born June 20, 1998) is an American professional basketball player who last played for the Cleveland Charge of the NBA G League. He played college basketball for the Dayton Flyers.

High school career
Landers played basketball for Wayne High School in Huber Heights, Ohio. As a junior, he helped his team win the Ohio Division I state championship. In his senior season, Landers averaged 16.4 points, 7.3 rebounds and 3.5 assists per game, earning First Team Division I All-Ohio honors from the Associated Press. On March 2, 2015, during his junior year, he committed to playing college basketball for Dayton, a team which had been recruiting him since he was a sophomore.

College career
Landers averaged three points in 5.8 minutes per game through nine appearances as a freshman, playing fewer minutes than any scholarship player on the team. He suffered from hernia pain throughout the season and underwent surgery to repair the injury. In the offseason, he improved his conditioning, losing 10 lbs (4.5 kg). On February 17, 2018, he scored a career-high 26 points in an 80–70 win over Fordham. As a sophomore, Landers averaged 11.3 points and 5.6 rebounds per game and registered four double-doubles. In early February of his junior season, he was replaced in the starting lineup by Obi Toppin. Landers averaged 8.2 points and 6.7 rebounds per game as a junior, while suffering from shoulder pain. On January 5, 2020, he scored a senior season-high 18 points in an 80–67 win against Saint Joseph's. Landers tied his season-high of 18 points on February 1, in a 70–56 win against Fordham. As a senior, he helped Dayton achieve its most successful season in program history, with head coach Anthony Grant calling him the "glue" of the team due to his leadership and attitude. Landers started in all but one game, averaging 10.5 points, 6.9 rebounds and 2.4 assists per game and recording four double-doubles. He was named to the Third Team All-Atlantic 10.

Professional career

Ulm (2020)
On August 3, 2020, Landers signed his first professional contract, a two-year deal with ratiopharm Ulm of the German Basketball Bundesliga.

Kataja BC (2021)
On July 7, 2021, he signed with Kataja BC of the Korisliiga. Landers averaged 5.8 points per game.

Cleveland Charge (2022)
On January 4, 2022, he signed with the Cleveland Charge of the NBA G League.

Career statistics

College

|-
| style="text-align:left;"| 2016–17
| style="text-align:left;"| Dayton
| 9 || 0 || 5.8 || .647 || .333 || .400 || 1.4 || .3 || .3 || .2 || 3.0
|-
| style="text-align:left;"| 2017–18
| style="text-align:left;"| Dayton
| 29 || 29 || 28.9 || .583 || .352 || .725 || 5.6 || 1.8 || 1.1 || .4 || 11.3
|-
| style="text-align:left;"| 2018–19
| style="text-align:left;"| Dayton
| 32 || 21 || 27.4 || .474 || .200 || .694 || 6.7 || 2.0 || .6 || .3 || 8.2
|-
| style="text-align:left;"| 2019–20
| style="text-align:left;"| Dayton
| 31 || 30 || 28.8 || .565 || .313 || .604 || 6.9 || 2.4 || 1.0 || .4 || 10.5
|- class="sortbottom"
| style="text-align:center;" colspan="2"| Career
| 101 || 80 || 26.3 || .544 || .295 || .660 || 6.0 || 1.9 || .9 || .3 || 9.4

Personal life
His father, Robert Sr., was shot and killed in front of a repair shop on December 19, 2006, a case that remains unsolved. Landers' older brother, Robert Jr., played college football for Ohio State as a defensive tackle. His mother, Tracy Mathews, who teaches medical classes at the Dayton JobCorps,was a strong supporter of Trey attending the University of Dayton.

References

External links
Dayton Flyers bio

1998 births
Living people
American men's basketball players
American expatriate basketball people in Finland
American expatriate basketball people in Germany
Basketball players from Dayton, Ohio
Cleveland Charge players
Dayton Flyers men's basketball players
Kataja BC players
Ratiopharm Ulm players
Shooting guards
People from Huber Heights, Ohio